"Finders Are Keepers" is a song written and recorded by American country music artist Hank Williams Jr. It was released in May 1989 as the second single from his compilation album Hank Williams Jr.'s Greatest Hits, Vol. 3.  The song reached number 6 on the Billboard Hot Country Singles & Tracks chart.

Chart performance

Year-end charts

References

1989 singles
Hank Williams Jr. songs
Songs written by Hank Williams Jr.
Song recordings produced by Barry Beckett
Song recordings produced by Jim Ed Norman
Warner Records singles
Curb Records singles
1989 songs